Victor Parlicov is a Moldovan energy expert. He was director of the National Agency for Energy Regulation. Since 16 February 2023, he is the Minister of Energy of the country.

References 

Government ministers of Moldova
Living people
Year of birth missing (living people)